Sunjay Sudhir is an Indian diplomat and current Indian Ambassador to the United Arab Emirates. He previously served as India's High Commissioner to Maldives from 2019 to 2021.

Career 
Sunjay Sudhir joined the Indian Foreign Service in 1993. In his diplomatic career, he has served in different Indian Missions abroad include Consul General of India in Sydney (2014–15); Counsellor at the Permanent Mission of India to the World Trade Organization, Geneva (2007–11), Head of the Economic and Commercial Wing at the Indian High Commission, Colombo (2004–07), Second Secretary (Political, Information and Culture) at the Indian Embassy, Damascus (1997-2000) and Third Secretary at the Indian Embassy, Cairo (1995–97). His postings at Headquarters include Joint Secretary and Head of the Office of External Affairs Minister (2012–14), Joint Secretary (SAARC), Deputy Chief of Protocol (2002–04), and in the Europe West Division (2000)

He also holds a degree of Bachelor of Technology from the Indian Institute of Technology – New Delhi and has pursued Diplomatic Studies at Oxford University (UK). In International Trade, Mr Sudhir has done Certificate Courses on TRIPS Agreement and Public Health, WTO Law and Jurisprudence, and WTO Dispute Settlement. In Energy, he has been Director on the Boards of ONGC Videsh Ltd, Oil India Ltd and Indian Strategic Petroleum Reserves Ltd. He is currently an Associate Editor on the editorial board of OPEC Energy Review.

Personal life 
Sunjay Sudhir is married and has two children.

References

Living people
High Commissioners of India
High Commissioners to the Maldives
Ambassadors of India to the United Arab Emirates
Indian Institutes of Technology alumni
Alumni of the University of Oxford
Year of birth missing (living people)